Nils Lennart Johansson (5 November 1929 – 4 June 2019) was a Swedish sports official who served as the fifth and, to date, longest-serving president of UEFA, the Union of European Football Associations. He served in the position from his election at the UEFA Congress in 1990 until 2007. In June 1998, he contested the FIFA presidential election against Sepp Blatter, losing by 111 votes to 80.

Early life 
As a child, he used to bike from his home to Råsunda Stadium to watch AIK matches along with his brothers. He also played football for his local team Åkeshov.

Career 
Johansson worked at Forbo Forshaga (now Forbo Flooring) from 1950 to 1990, starting as an errand-boy and in the end becoming the company's CEO and chairman. From 1984, he was a president of the board of Tipstjänst and Operakällaren; he was also chairman and president of AIK between 1967 and 1980. Johansson was a lifelong supporter of AIK.

Between 1985 and 1990, Johansson was the president of the Swedish Football Association. In 1990, he was voted UEFA President at the UEFA Congress in Malta. Johansson helped found the UEFA Champions League, replacing the European Cup. Johansson supported Sweden's bid to host UEFA Euro 1992, and England's bid to host UEFA Euro 1996. During Johansson's presidency, the UEFA headquarters were also moved from Bern to Nyon.

In June 1998, Johansson contested Sepp Blatter to become FIFA President; he lost by 111 votes to 80. It was alleged that Blatter's victory had been helped by bribery involving João Havelange. After the election, Johansson accused Blatter of financial mismanagement, and voted for Issa Hayatou rather than Blatter at the 2002 FIFA presidency election.

In 2007, Johansson was succeeded as UEFA president by Michel Platini. In October 2007, he was appointed chairman of a committee for bringing bandy into the Olympic programme.

In 2001, the trophy given to the winning team of Swedish league Allsvenskan was renamed after Johansson: Lennart Johanssons Pokal. Prior to this the trophy had been named after Clarence von Rosen.

Awards and honours 

   Illis quorum, 12th size (22 February 2005)
   Great Cross of Merit of the Order of Merit of the Federal Republic of Germany (2005)
   Supreme Companion of the Order of the Companions of O. R. Tambo (29 October 2004)
   Commander's Cross of the Hungarian Order of Merit (22 March 2006)
   Knight's Cross of the Order of the Falcon (18 November 1997)
   Officer of the National Order of Merit (August 2002)
   Third Class of the Order of Prince Yaroslav the Wise
   First Class of the Order of Merit
   Third Class of the Order of Merit
   Second Class of the Order of Friendship (2005)
   Order of Friendship
 CAF's Order of Merit
 Unidentified Red Cross Medal

Personal life 
Johansson was married twice and had five children. He was married to his first wife, Anna-Stina Eriksson (1922–2005), from 1953 to 1980, with whom he had two daughters. His second marriage was with Lola Sidenvall (1929–2017). In December 2017, he became a widower after his wife Lola died.

In 2008, he suffered a severe cerebral hemorrhage, and after that his physical health began to fail. Johansson died on 4 June 2019, aged 89.

Notes

References 

1929 births
2019 deaths
Swedish sports executives and administrators
Swedish bandy managers
Football in Sweden
Presidents of UEFA
Swedish Christians
Commanders Crosses of the Order of Merit of the Federal Republic of Germany
Recipients of the Order of the Companions of O. R. Tambo
AIK Fotboll directors and chairmen
Chairmen of the Swedish Football Association
Association football executives
Sportspeople from Stockholm
Members of the UEFA Executive Committee
Recipients of the Order of Prince Yaroslav the Wise, 3rd class
Recipients of the Illis quorum